Smerch was a monitor built for the Imperial Russian Navy in the early 1860s. She was designed by the British shipbuilder Charles Mitchell and built in Saint Petersburg. The ship spent her entire career with the Baltic Fleet. She ran aground and sank shortly after she entered service in 1865. Smerch was refloated and repaired shortly afterwards. She became a training ship sometime after 1892 and was stricken from the Navy List in 1904. The ship was hulked five years later and renamed Blokshiv No. 2. She was in Finland when that country declared its independence in 1918, but was returned to the Soviets after the Treaty of Brest-Litovsk was signed. Blokshiv No. 1, as the ship was now known, was sunk by German artillery fire in 1941. She was salvaged the following year and remained in service until she was stricken in 1959 and subsequently broken up.

Design and description

The ship was designed to displace , but turned out to be overweight and actually displaced . Smerch was fitted with a double bottom that could be flooded in combat to reduce her freeboard. Her crew numbered 11 officers and 122 enlisted men in 1867 and 12 officers and 143 crewmen in 1875.

She had a freeboard of only  and her deck was often awash in any sort of moderate sea. Smerch rolled heavily and was fitted with three telescoping iron pole masts, probably fore-and-aft rigged, that were used to steady the ship rather than for propulsion.

Propulsion
The ship had two simple horizontal direct-acting steam engines, built by Maudslay, Sons and Field of London. The ship also had a small donkey boiler for the small steam engine that powered the ventilation fans, the main water pump and rotated the aft turret. Another such engine probably rotated the forward turret.

Armament
Smerch was initially armed with four 60-pounder  smoothbore muzzle-loading guns, a pair in each turret. Various deckhouses and ventilation hatches prevented the turrets from firing directly forward or aft, so each turret could bear approximately 145° to each side, although this changed slightly over time as changes were made to the ship. In 1867 these were replaced by two Krupp  rifled breech-loading guns. Only one gun could fit in the turrets so the old gun ports were plated over and new ones cut in each turret. Three years later, the Krupp guns were replaced by Obukhov  rifled guns. They were replaced in their turn in 1876 by two longer, more powerful 9-inch Obukhov guns. The ship carried 120 rounds for each gun. A furnace for the molten iron required by Martin's incendiary shells was fitted between the turrets.

Light guns for use against torpedo boats are not known to have been fitted aboard the ship before the 1870s when Smerch received four 4-pounder  guns, one  Engström quick-firing (QF) gun, and a  Gatling gun. At some point the ship received four QF  Hotchkiss revolving cannon. They were mounted on the turret tops and probably replaced the older 4-pounders.

Armor
The armor was backed by 8 inches of teak. The walls of the ship's oval conning tower were also 4.5 inches thick.

Construction and service
Smerch (Waterspout) was ordered on 25 June 1863 and construction began on 13 August at the Admiralty Shipyard, Saint Petersburg, although the formal keel-laying was not until 1 December. She was launched on 23 June 1864 and completed in 1865 at the cost of 554,100 rubles. The ship spent her career with the Baltic Fleet. Smerch struck an uncharted rock off the Finnish coast on 4 August in shallow water and sank. Using pontoons, she was refloated on 1 September and repaired. Little is known of her service other than she was extensively refitted in 1882 and 1889 which included replacement of much of the plating of her hull bottom. The ship was reclassified as a coast-defense ironclad on 13 February 1892 and subsequently became a training ship.

The ship was stricken from the Navy List on 20 February 1904 and turned over to the Port of Kronstadt for disposal. Smerch was renamed Blokshiv (Hulk) No. 2 on 27 October 1909 and converted into a mine storage hulk. She was abandoned in April 1918 as the Soviets abandoned Finland, but was returned to them the following month according to the terms of the Treaty of Brest-Litovsk. The hulk was renamed Blokshiv No. 3 in 1923 and later as Blokshiv No. 1 on 1 January 1932. She was sunk by German artillery on 7 October 1941 in Kronstadt harbor and was stricken on 6 March 1942. The hulk was salvaged in mid-1942 and reentered service on 8 December. She was renamed BSh-1 on 16 May 1949, stricken for the last time on 2 April 1959, and subsequently scrapped.

Notes

Footnotes

References

 
 

Naval ships of Russia
Ironclad warships of the Imperial Russian Navy
1864 ships
Ships built at Admiralty Shipyard
Maritime incidents in August 1865
Maritime incidents in October 1941
Ships sunk by coastal artillery